ESPNews (pronounced "ESPN News", stylized ESPNEWS) is an American multinational digital cable and satellite television network owned by ESPN Inc., a joint venture between the Disney Media Networks division of The Walt Disney Company (which owns a controlling 80% stake) and Hearst Communications (which owns the remaining 20%).

Known as "ESPN3" in its planning stages and proposed as early as 1993, the channel launched on November 1, 1996, and originally featured a rolling news format with 24-hour coverage of sports news and highlights. Since 2010, the network has largely shifted away from this format, and now primarily carries television simulcasts of ESPN Radio shows, encores of ESPN's weekday lineup of studio programs, and overflow event programming in the event of conflicts with the other ESPN networks.

As of November 2021, ESPNews reaches approximately 59 million television households in the United States.

Format and programming
ESPNews is typically offered on the digital tiers of U.S. cable providers, and is carried as a premium channel in some areas; satellite providers offer it on their standard package. Some regional sports networks that are not associated with Fox Sports Networks had previously aired ESPNews during the overnight or morning hours to provide a pseudo-national sportscast to their viewers, and to fill time that would otherwise be taken up by paid programming or other lower-profile programs, though as vertical integration has occurred with the sports networks now owned by Comcast (with NBC Sports) and Charter Communications, ESPNews programming has been dropped from these networks; however, its programming is still carried during the overnight hours on MASN2. If a national ESPN broadcast is blacked out in a particular market, the ESPN broadcast will usually be replaced by ESPNews.

The network was formerly simulcast on ESPN during coverage of major breaking sports news before that network expanded SportsCenter into additional daytime slots in 2008; additionally, ABC's early morning newscast, America This Morning, previously ran a highlights segment rundown featuring sports news headlines and highlights of the previous night's sporting events presented by an ESPNews overnight anchor.

The channel's BottomLine ticker was formerly more in-depth than the versions used by ESPN's other networks. It contained not only scores, but also statistics and brief news alerts about the day's sports headlines. However, in June 2010, the network switched to the standard BottomLine and screen presentation used by all other ESPN networks in preparation for the launch of SportsCenter broadcasts..

On November 11, 2006, the channel marked its 10-year anniversary; programming commemorating the occasion included a montage of highlights covering the past 10 years in sports. The network began airing SportsCenter on nights when sporting event telecasts on ESPN and ESPN2, such as college football or Major League Baseball games, were scheduled to overrun into the program's regular timeslots on ESPN and ESPN2's own sports analysis programs, which until 2010 would be the only incidences in which SportsCenter would be carried over to ESPNews.

XM Satellite Radio and Sirius Satellite Radio both provide channels with audio simulcasts of ESPNEWS, with the network's television advertisements replaced with radio ads from each service. On February 4, 2008, XM rebranded its channel as "ESPN Xtra", and added radio programs from local ESPN Radio affiliates as well as the audio simulcast of ESPNEWS.

In August 2010, telecasts of SportsCenter on ESPNews increased in frequency, now airing whenever ESPN or ESPN2 were unable to air the program due to scheduling conflicts, along with an afternoon expansion of SportsCenter to the channel's afternoon schedule rather than rolling ESPNews-branded coverage, while ESPN and ESPN2 carry sports talk and debate programming. The Beat (a show showing pop culture and sports action to the tune of a beat) was shown while SportsCenter aired on ESPN at 6:00 p.m. Eastern Time until its cancellation in July 2011, and replacement by a rebroadcast of the ESPN2 sports talk program SportsNation. By early 2013, the only other programs featured on ESPNews were Highlight Express (a half-hour program showing the previous day's sports highlights, running from 10:00 p.m. to 3:00 p.m. Eastern Time in the afternoon), and the overnight soccer program ESPNFC Press Pass. The network also airs programming under the College Football Live banner on Saturday afternoons during college football season, a whip-around program similar to ESPN Goal Line, which gives live look-ins to multiple college football games happening simultaneously.

On June 13, 2013, Highlight Express was canceled due to low ratings and company-wide downsizing, leaving the overnight ESPNFC Press Pass, produced primarily for ESPN International, as the only program on the network that was exclusively broadcast (within the U.S.) on ESPNews; that program was removed from the schedule in August 2013, after it was supplanted by a new ESPN2 program simply titled ESPN FC. Additional runs of SportsCenter and other same-day airings of ESPN sports debate programming or the newsmagazine E:60 now fill the network's schedule, along with encores such as Friday Night Fights, as well as programming affected by sports-induced pre-emptions and overruns such as Olbermann during the US Open. The highlights and segment package for America This Morning came under the purview of the late-night SportsCenter team from Los Angeles from that day forward.

On November 29, 2017 as part of an expected announcement of 150 behind the scenes staffs being laid off from the network, ESPN announced that the primetime SportsCenter editions carried in primetime on ESPNews would be terminated after November 30 to cut costs (breaking sports news coverage will be maintained when needed). They were replaced by a block of reruns of ESPN and ESPN2's daytime talk programs, including Around the Horn, Highly Questionable, Outside the Lines, Pardon the Interruption, and SportsNation.

In March 2019, ESPNews premiered Daily Wager, a new weekday studio show devoted to sports betting. In August 2019, it was announced that Daily Wager would move to ESPN2 on August 20, and that ESPNews would add a new L-bar to its on-screen graphics during non-event programming (as well as during Daily Wager on ESPN2), featuring betting lines and other statistics. The feature is part of ESPN's partnership with the sportsbook of Caesars Entertainment.

Use as an overflow feed for live coverage
ESPNEWS ran a simulcast of ESPN Radio's Mike and Mike in the Morning from 2004 to 2005; the program moved to ESPN2 in 2006, although it still occasionally airs on ESPNEWS when live sports events (such as tennis' French Open or Wimbledon) air on ESPN2. When ESPN2 televised the 2009 U.S. Open tennis tournament, SportsNation aired on ESPNEWS instead from August 31 to September 11, 2009.

As ESPN Classic's carriage declined more into specialty cable tiers due to bandwidth conservation concerns and low viewership, along with no high-definition channel ever being established before its demise on December 31, 2021, ESPNEWS became the primary overflow network for situations in which ESPN and ESPN2 carry live sports coverage, with ESPNU, the ACC Network and SEC Network being limited to college sports overflow situations.

 The network aired two National Invitation Tournament college basketball games on March 25, 2013 that were originally scheduled to air on ESPN, which instead aired an NBA game telecast between the Miami Heat and the Orlando Magic (a game in which the Heat extended its winning streak to 27 games).
 Another NBA overflow of the late game of that night's ESPN doubleheader aired partially two days later on March 27 due to ESPN2 already carrying coverage of the 2013 NCAA Women's Division I Basketball Tournament until the first game on ESPN ended, with ESPN having an extended post-game show for the first game due to the Heat's aforementioned winning streak ending at the hands of the Chicago Bulls.
 Coverage of the NCAA Women's Softball Preliminary Tournament aired on ESPNEWS on May 18, 2013, due to NBA playoff coverage on ESPN and X Games Barcelona coverage on ESPN2.
 The network's most apparent overflow use has been with the NASCAR Nationwide Series in 2013. On April 26, ESPNEWS carried full live coverage of the Toyota Care 250 at Richmond International Raceway, due to NBA playoff coverage on ESPN, with the 2013 NFL Draft's second night airing on ESPN2. The Kentucky 300 on September 21 from Kentucky Speedway was also moved over to ESPNEWS due to college football games airing on both ESPN networks.
 On August 31, ESPNEWS aired three college football games, including the Kentucky–Western Kentucky game live from LP Field in Nashville, presumably due to all other ESPN networks being fully booked for college games at that time. ESPN Goal Line also has been expanded onto additional cable systems through new carriage agreements struck by The Walt Disney Company in early 2013, making the Goal Line simulcast unneeded.
 ESPN's coverage of Wimbledon was often moved to ESPNews in 2014 due to their coverage of the 2014 FIFA World Cup.
 ESPN's coverage of the Wisconsin v. USC Holiday Bowl was moved to ESPNews in 2015.
 ESPN's coverage of the northeast regional NCAA hockey tournament, due to the NCAA Women's basketball tournament on ESPN, NCAA baseball and softball on ESPN2 and NCAA lacrosse and other regional games of the NCAA hockey tournament on ESPN-U in 2018. 
 Also due to live coverage on ESPN and ESPN2 of the NCAA Women's basketball tournament, ESPNews showed the rest of the day's Miami Open quarterfinal and semifinal coverage that was shown on ESPN2 before primetime coverage of the basketball tournament.
Olbermann was also carried live on ESPNEWS on weeknights if sports coverage on ESPN2 overflowed into that program's regular time slot.
 The network aired Game 6 in the first round of the 2018 NBA Playoffs on April 27, 2018 between the Toronto Raptors and the Washington Wizards due to ESPN airing coverage of the 2018 NFL Draft (which would later shift to ESPN2) and later airing another first-round game between the Indiana Pacers and Cleveland Cavaliers. Additionally, this game was also simulcast on NBA TV using the ESPN feed.
 In June 2018, it was announced that six National Women's Soccer League matches through the end of the 2018 season would air on ESPNews, as part of its broadcast arrangement with fellow Disney/Hearst venture A&E Networks and Lifetime.
 Game 3 of the semifinal round of the 2018 WNBA Playoffs between the Atlanta Dream and Washington Mystics aired on ESPNEWS due to a college football game (Western Kentucky–Wisconsin) on ESPN and the third round of the US Open airing on ESPN2. As with the Raptors–Wizards playoff game mentioned earlier, this game was also simulcast on NBA TV using the ESPNews feed including the BottomLine ticker which was displayed above their own ticker.

Additionally, ESPNEWS simulcasted ESPN Deportes' coverage of the 2018 Supercopa de España, the first time it has aired Spanish-language programming although the BottomLine ticker continued to be displayed in English.

List of programs broadcast by ESPNews

Current

 Keyshawn, JWill and Max (September 2021 – present)
 SportsCenter (2008–present)

Former
 4 Qtrs (2003–2006)
 The Beat (2009–2010)
 Coaches' Corner (aired on Tuesday from 2001–2005)
Daily Wager (2019–present)
 The Dan Le Batard Show with Stugotz (2018-2020)
 ESPNEWS (1996-2011)
 ESPNEWS Late Night (2003–2010)
 ESPNEWS Morning Final (2003–2010)
 ESPNEWS Early Evening (2003–2006)
 ESPNEWS Day (2006–2009)
 ESPNEWS Gametime (2006–2009) 
 ESPNEWS Night Cap (2005–2006)
 ESPNEWS Postgame (2006–2009) 
 ESPNEWS Pregame (2006–2009) 
 ESPN Radio Primetime (2007–2008)
 Football Friday (2004–2009) 
 The Highlight Zone (2008–2009) 
 Highlight Express (2010–2013)
 The Hot List (2003–2009) 
 Mike and Mike in the Morning (2004–2006; simulcast of ESPN Radio show; moved to ESPN2 in 2006, still aired on ESPNEWS when ESPN2 was scheduled to air live sports events; the ESPN2 simulcast is rebroadcast mornings beginning at 10:00 a.m. Eastern)
 NFL Monday Quarterback (aired on Mondays from 2001–2005)
 The Pulse (2004–2009)
 The Ryen Russillo Show (??–2017)
 The Stephen A. Smith Show (2017-January 2020)
 The Will Cain Show (2018– June 2020)
 Golic and Wingo (2018–2020)
 First Take, Your Take with Jason Fitz (2020)
 Greeny (August 2020 – November 2020)
 The Max Kellerman Show (August 2020 – November 2020)
 Chiney and Golic Jr. (August 2020 – November 2020)

ESPN Radio segment
In 2007, ESPNEWS began broadcasting a half-hour segment of ESPN Radio programming on Sunday mornings. The broadcast includes three commentators (a retired coach, a retired player, and an analyst) to break down the events of the featured sport, while an on-screen graphical list of standings, statistical leaders, and other statistics of the featured sport is displayed; the upper-right of the screen shows sports highlights (usually of the player or team of discussion); a fan comment board appears at the bottom of the screen, above the ESPNEWS BottomLine.

High definition
ESPNEWS operates a high definition simulcast feed, which broadcasts in 720p (the default resolution format for The Walt Disney Company's television properties) and was launched on March 30, 2008. Originally, the layout and graphics were reworked specifically for viewing on widescreen television sets, offering additional content not available on the channel's standard definition feed. It utilized reworked HD sideline graphics, a descendant of the "Rundown" used on overnight editions of SportsCenter on ESPN, which wrapped around the top left and bottom of the widescreen picture. The HD Sideline offered the display of textual information, headshots, news and scores, while still delivering video highlights in the HD format.

The enhanced format was discontinued in June 2010 and the channel now broadcasts in near-fullscreen 16:9, with regular gray and red graphics similar to those used by the other ESPN channels. The move was made to "accommodate the high number of SportsCenters that moved to the network during the World Cup".

On May 20, 2012, ESPNEWS switched the presentation of its standard definition feed from 4:3 to a downscaled widescreen letterbox version of the HD feed, becoming the last ESPN network with a HD companion channel to make the conversion to a full-widescreen presentation. ESPNEWS HD was added to Dish Network on March 18, 2014, as part of a new carriage agreement that ended a four-year dispute that removed existing HD simulcast feeds of Disney-owned channels.

International versions
While not operating under the ESPN name, CTV Specialty Television (which is partly owned by ESPN) operates RDS Info, a French-language sister network to Réseau des sports (RDS) (which in turn, is a sister network to the English language TSN), which maintains a sports news format and ticker similar to that used by ESPNews, and carries continuous broadcasts of Sports 30 (RDS's equivalent of SportsCenter). Until October 2011, when RDS2 was launched, RDS Info was also used as a part-time secondary outlet for RDS in the event of scheduling conflicts. It has since served as an occasional tertiary outlet for RDS programming, similar to the role now served by ESPNews.

ESPN Star Sports (a joint venture between ESPN International and Star TV) operated an Asian version of ESPNews that was launched in November 2009 in Singapore on Singtel's Mio TV and later expanded to other areas, including Hong Kong, where it was launched in August 2011 on PCCW's Now TV. It was renamed Fox Sports News in 2013, following News Corporation's full take over of ESPN Star Sports, before it was closed down in 2017.

See also
 List of ESPNews personalities
 SportsCenter

References
 ESPN Mediakit (2006). Retrieved 2006-02-13.

ESPN media outlets
Sirius Satellite Radio channels
Digital-only radio stations
Disney acquisitions
The Walt Disney Company subsidiaries
English-language television stations in the United States
Television channels and stations established in 1996
Sports television networks in the United States